Mustafa Köse (born 27 June 1977 in Istanbul, Turkey) is a Turkish lawyer and politician and member of Turkish Parliament ,also Member of Justice and development party in Turkey and deputy in the Turkish Parliament for Antalya

References 

Living people
Lawyers from Istanbul
Deputies of Antalya
1977 births